The 2000 NRL season was the 93rd season of professional rugby league football in Australia and the third to be run by the National Rugby League. Fourteen teams competed from February till August for the NRL Premiership, culminating in the 2000 NRL Grand final between the Brisbane Broncos and the Sydney Roosters.

Season summary

The 2000 National Rugby League season started with a new CEO in rugby union's David Moffett who replaced Neil Whittaker in late 1999.

The season began in early February to accommodate the Sydney 2000 Olympic Games which were to be held during September and required the use of Stadium Australia, the grand final venue. The grand final was scheduled for late August, the first grand final in that month since 1963. The capacity of Stadium Australia for the grand final was limited due to preparations for the Opening Ceremony of the Olympic Games, which would take place just nineteen days later.

Throughout the month of February, mandatory breaks in play at the 20th and 60th minute of the game were implemented to allow players to rehydrate themselves. Due to concerns over the summer heat, the Brisbane and North Queensland clubs played their first four games away from home.

The Cowboys were stripped of two competition points after it was later revealed that they unwittingly used a fourteenth player for three minutes in their 26–18 win against the Parramatta Eels, due to an error in interchanging players.

Melbourne Storm players Stephen Kearney and Marcus Bai ended the career of Wests Tigers captain Jarrod McCracken with a spear tackle. Kearney was suspended for 8 matches and Bai for 2 matches. The two men were also sued by McCraken, who won a six-figure damages bill.

The Canberra Raiders and the Wests Tigers became the first teams to play a premiership game in the snow. It occurred at Bruce Stadium on 28 May and it is the only premiership game played in these conditions.

Teams 
The season saw the debut of the Wests Tigers (formed by the merging of the Balmain Tigers and Western Suburbs Magpies) and Northern Eagles (formed by the merging of the Manly-Warringah Sea Eagles and North Sydney Bears) in the National Rugby League. In addition, the South Sydney Rabbitohs were excluded from the competition, thereby completing the NRL's rationalisation process from 20 teams in 1998 to 14 in 2000.

For the 2000 season, the Canterbury-Bankstown Bulldogs changed their name again, this time to the geographically indistinct "Bulldogs" and the Auckland Warriors were re-branded the New Zealand Warriors at the end of the season.

Advertising
For the first time since farewelling Tina Turner in 1995 the NRL used a major recording star in its promotional campaign and accessed a media budget that saw the launch ad shown regularly throughout the season. Sydney advertising agency VCD in the last of their four-year tenure on the NRL account shot an ad with Tom Jones performing on stage alongside hi-kicking female dancers, the 1993 Salt-N-Pepa hit Whatta Man with lyrics re-worked as "What A Game".

Records and statistics
Martin Lang ran 4,571 metres with the ball in 2000, more than any other player in the competition.
Melbourne Storm club record for their biggest ever win and most points in a game : 70–10 over St. George Illawarra Dragons in round 5.
Melbourne Storm club record for their biggest ever loss : 50–4 loss to St. George Illawarra Dragons in round 18.
St. George Illawarra Dragons club record for their biggest ever win : 50–4 over Melbourne Storm in round 18.
North Queensland Cowboys scored their first ever 50 points in a game: 50–10 over Northern Eagles in round 8.

Ladder

Finals series
The biggest upset of the 2000 Finals series was in the 3rd Qualifying Final when 7th placed Parramatta Eels beat 2nd placed Sydney Roosters 32-8 at the SFS. It was nearly a similar story for Minor Premiers' the Brisbane Broncos when they came from 20-6 down at halftime to win 34-20 against 8th placed Cronulla-Sutherland Sharks in the 4th Qualifying Final at QSAC. The Sydney Roosters also made a famous comeback when they came from 16-2 down at halftime to win 26-20 against the Newcastle Knights in the 1st Preliminary Final at the SFS to earn a spot in the Grand final against Brisbane.

Chart

Grand final

Player statistics
The following statistics are as of the conclusion of Round 26.

Top 5 point scorers

Top 5 try scorers

Top 5 goal scorers

2000 Transfers

Players

Coaches

References

External links
 NRL official website
 NRL CEO David Moffat discusses the Tom Jones ad

 
1